On 26 July 2011, a C-130 Hercules military transport aircraft operated by the Royal Moroccan Air Force crashed near Guelmim, Morocco, killing all 80 people on board. The plane was carrying 71 passengers (initially reported as 72), mostly members of the Moroccan Armed Forces, and nine crew. Three occupants were pulled alive from the wreckage but later died of their injuries.

Accident
The aircraft involved, a four-engined Lockheed C-130H Hercules with registration CNA-OQ, was travelling from Dakhla Airport in Western Sahara to Kenitra Air Base, with a scheduled stopover at Guelmim.

At that time, the weather in the area was reported as poor.

It was the deadliest aviation accident of 2011, and Morocco's deadliest military aviation disaster.

King Mohammed VI announced three days of national mourning following the crash.

See also
List of accidents and incidents involving the Lockheed C-130 Hercules

References

2011 in Morocco
Aviation accidents and incidents in Morocco
Aviation accidents and incidents in 2011
Guelmim-Oued Noun
Accidents and incidents involving the Lockheed C-130 Hercules
Royal Moroccan Air Force
July 2011 events in Africa
2011 disasters in Morocco